A carpenter pencil (carpentry pencil, carpenter's pencil) is a pencil that has a body with a rectangular or elliptical cross-section to prevent it from rolling away. Carpenter pencils are easier to grip than standard pencils, because they have a larger surface area. The non-round core allows thick or thin lines to be drawn by holding the pencil slightly rotated. Thin lines are required for high precision markings and are easy to erase, but thick markings are needed to mark on rough surfaces. The lead is strong to withstand the stress of marking on such surfaces. The pencil is robust to survive in a construction environment when carried together with heavy tools. The core is typically stronger than in other pencils. Carpenter pencils are used by builders because they can mark on surfaces like concrete or stone. This shape and lead density aid in marking legible lines with a straight edge that are clear and easy to follow with a saw blade. Carpenter pencils are typically manually sharpened with a knife, although special sharpeners can be used. 

The flat pencil is one of the oldest pencil types. The first versions were made by hollowing out sticks of juniper wood. A superior technique was discovered: two wooden halves were carved with a groove running down them, a plumbago stick placed in one of the grooves, and the two halves then glued together—essentially the same method in use to this day. Similar pencils (called 'jumbo pencils') are sometimes used by children. A pencil that is designed for a child rather than a carpenter would likely have a softer core, enabling the user to draw with less physical effort. 

Carpenter pencils are sometimes used by artists and designers to draw a thick line easily when needed. Notching the middle of the lead with the corner of a file makes it possible to draw two parallel lines at once, a technique used by artists and calligraphers.

References

External links
 Carpenter's Pencil, by Doug Martin

Pencils
Woodworking hand tools
Woodworking
Carpentry